Caloptilia pterostoma is a moth of the family Gracillariidae. It is known from Assam and Meghalaya, India.

References

pterostoma
Moths of Asia
Moths described in 1922